Łukasz Kubot and Marcelo Melo were the defending champions, but lost in the first round to Steve Johnson and Sam Querrey.

Bob and Mike Bryan won the title, defeating Karen Khachanov and Andrey Rublev in the final, 4–6, 7–6(7–5), [10–4].

Seeds

Draw

Finals

Top half

Bottom half

References
 Main Draw

2018 Miami Open